Getting Over You or Gettin' Over You may refer to:

"(I Think I'm Over) Getting Over You", a song by Tony Hazzard, later covered by multiple artists
"Getting Over You", a song by Astrud Gilberto
"Getting Over You", a song by Hank Williams Jr., 1974
"Getting Over You", a song by Alabama from My Home's in Alabama
"Getting Over You", a song by Deana Carter from The Story of My Life
"Getting Over You", a song by Metro Station from Savior, 2015
"Gettin' Over You", a song by David Guetta	
"Gettin' Over You", a song by Mason Dixon, 1984
"Gettin' Over You", a song by Stoneground from the album Stoneground 3, 1972
"Gettin' Over You", a song by Grand Funk Railroad from Shinin' On
"Gettin' Over You", a song by The Bam Balams, 1986